Claire-Marie Le Guay (born 13 June 1974) is a French classical pianist.

Early life 
Le Guay was born in Paris, France. She began playing piano at age 4 and entered the Paris Conservatoire at age 14, where she studied with Jacques Rouvier, Pascal Devoyon and Bruno Rigutto. Following her education in Paris, Le Guay continued her training with a variety of established teachers, including Dmitri Bashkirov, Fou Ts'ong, Claude Frank, Stanislav Ioudenitch, Alicia de Larrocha, William Grant Naboré, Andreas Staier, György Sebők, and Leon Fleisher.

Accomplishments and award

Le Guay has also been championed by Daniel Barenboim, who invited her to perform with the Chicago Civic Orchestra. Le Guay has performed at a variety of prestigious venues including Carnegie Hall and Wigmore Hall.

In 2015 Le Guay was selected to participate in the 2nd Women's Leadership Program Eisenhower Fellows.

Current projects
Le Guay is currently recording her final two installments of the four-volume Haydn-Mozart series, to be released on the Universal Accord label.

She has also worked as an assistant to Bruno Rigutto at the Paris Conservatoire since 2001.

Recordings

References

External links

 Claire-Marie Le Guay (Biography)

1974 births
21st-century French women classical pianists
Living people
Musicians from Paris
Eisenhower Fellows